Major General Madan Shumsher Jung Bahadur Rana was a Nepalese cricketer and son of 13th Prime Minister of Nepal Chandra Shumsher JBR.

He is considered the Father of Nepali Cricket''' as he introduced Cricket to Nepal for the first time in the 1920s and organized many competitions. In 1947, he was made the president of the first ever football committee formed in Nepal.
After his death in 1955, the Madan Puraskar award and Madan Puraskar Pustakalaya archive library were established in his honor by his wife, Jagadamba Kumari Devi, dedicated to Nepalis contributing in Nepali Language, Literature, Art and Folk Culture Field.

Competitions 
 1947 General Madan instituted the 'Bishnu Trophy' for league tournaments.
 1952 Madan Memorial Shield instituted.

See also
Cricket in Nepal
Madan Puraskar
Madan Puraskar Pustakalaya
Jagadamba Kumari Devi

References

Year of birth missing
Year of death missing
Nepalese cricketers
Rana dynasty
Children of prime ministers of Nepal